Elmer John Kilroy (August 4, 1895 – November 5, 1961) was Speaker of the Pennsylvania House of Representatives.

Biography
Kilroy was born ib August 4, 1895 in Philadelphia, Pennsylvania, and served in the House from 1931 thorough 1942.

He grandauted from LaSalle College, and served in the United States Marine Corps from 1916 to 1917.

He died on November 5, 1961.

See also
 Speaker of the Pennsylvania House of Representatives

References

External links
Profile at Our Campaigns

Speakers of the Pennsylvania House of Representatives
Democratic Party members of the Pennsylvania House of Representatives
1895 births
1961 deaths
Politicians from Philadelphia
United States Marines
La Salle University alumni
20th-century American politicians